JPV was an Icelandic publishing house, established in 2001 by Jóhann Páll Valdimarsson, from whose initials the press takes its name.  On 1 October 2007, JPV merged with the publishers Mál og menning, Vaka-Helgafell and Bókaútgáfan Iðunn under the name Forlagið. However, books continue to be published under the JPV imprint.

References

External links
 Official website

Literary publishing companies
Publishing companies of Iceland